Omar Mosaad Abouzid (born March 17, 1988 in Cairo) is a professional squash player who represents Egypt. He reached a career-high world ranking of World No. 3 in 2016.

Career overview
After a promising junior career in which he won U17 and U19 British Junior Open titles and reached the World Junior Championship final in 2006, Omar Mosaad quickly established his senior credentials by going on to win eight PSA World Tour titles from 20 final appearances - and celebrating a career-high world No 3 ranking in June 2016.

After joining the PSA in 2005, the tall and imposing Cairo-based Egyptian reached his first Tour final the following year in Iran where he won the FAJR International in Tehran.

Success in 2008 earned him the PSA Young Player of the Year Award at the end of the year.

But Mosaad began to make his elite breakthrough in 2010: In his first two events of the year he picked up two Tour titles in the USA - firstly the new Kig Open in Los Angeles, then the Racquet Club Invitational in St Louis. By the end of the year, Mosaad had broken into the world top 20.

It was at the Kuala Lumpur Open last year that Mosaad picked up the eighth – and biggest - title of his career. After despatching former champion and local hero Ong Beng Hee in the semis, the third-seeded Mosaad survived a 112-minute final over Adrian Grant, beating the experienced Englishman 11-6, 12-10, 12-14, 6-11, 11-8 to claim his first PSA International 50 title.

In November, he reached the biggest final of his career after a major breakthrough in the quarter-finals of the PSA International 70 Abierto Mexicano de Raquetas in Mexico, where he upset compatriot Karim Darwish, the No2 seed. Another five-game win over Germany’s Simon Rösner took the unseeded Mosaad into the final, where he went down in straight games to France’s Grégory Gaultier.

Mosaad made his long-awaited debut for Egypt in the 2013 World Team Championship in France – recording four wins out of four.

It was in the Colombian capital Bogota later that Mosaad reached the 20th Tour final of his career. He denied local hero Miguel Ángel Rodríguez a place in the Colombian Open final after beating the former champion 3/0 in the semis, before going down to England’s top seed Peter Barker.

In October 2013 "Hammer of Thor" won the Macau Open. He played the final against Adrian Grant and beat him 11-8, 4-11, 9-11, 11-9, 11-8. Taking with him another title.
The talented Egyptian is unequivocal about his ambition: "I want to be world number one!"

He is 2015 World Open Squash Championship runner-up.

World Open final appearances

0 title & 1 runner-up

Major World Series final appearances

US Open: 1 final (0 title, 1 runner-up)

References

External links 
 
 

1988 births
Living people
Egyptian male squash players
Competitors at the 2009 World Games
21st-century Egyptian people